The Scottish Open Championship is a motorcycle speedway championship held annually in Scotland.

History
The Championship has been run almost every year since 1928. That inaugural year saw two events, one for 350 cc bikes and another for 500 cc bikes. From 1929 the event was only open to those riding the 500 cc bikes.

Run as the Scottish Championship from 1928-1945, it became the Scottish Riders Championship from 1949-1954 before a third and final name change in 1960 to the Scottish Open Championship.

Since 1988, the winner of the Scottish Open has been presented with the Jack Young Memorial Trophy in honour of the three time winner and former Edinburgh Monarchs rider from Australia who won the Speedway World Championship in 1951 and 1952. Young won the World Championship in 1951 while riding for the Monarchs, thus becoming the first second division rider to win the World crown. Young died from Emphysema in his home town of Adelaide, South Australia on 28 August 1987.

Winners (since 1928)

References

Motorsport in Scotland
Speedway competitions in the United Kingdom